St George's Church is a Grade I listed building in Stamford, Lincolnshire, England.

History 
A major benefactor of the church was William Bruges (1375–1450), first Garter King of Arms who is buried in the church. St George's claims to be the original church of the Order of the Garter.  Originally the chancel contained a series of seven windows containing portraits of the Knights of the Garter, but  little remains apart from a collection of garter panes in the north chancel window and a few fragments in the south window including the centre panes of St Catherine and St Anne. The roof of the chancel with decorative angels was also the gift of Bruges. The central angels on each side carry on their shields the "Signs of the Passion", the pierced heart and wounded hands and feet of Christ.

There are numerous memorial tablets adorning the inside of the church including one commemorating Tobie Norris (d. 1626) after whom a Stamford pub is named and Blanche, Lady Wake (d. 1379). In the south aisle there is a Hugh Arnold stained glass window (1909) to the memory of architect John Charles Traylen.

The church's tower was probably built in the early 13th Century when the first rector was ordained and is mostly original except the top section, which was rebuilt in the 17th century. The nave has some of the original 13th Century columns as well as 14th and 15th century expansions.
The interior of the church was subject to Victorian restoration when pews were removed, a new pulpit built, and the floor re-laid.

In 1949 Bowman & Sons supplied a George & Dragon figure by Mahomet Thomas Phillips for the church's Second World War memorial.

Rectory 

The Rectory is located at 16, St George's Square. Dating from 1881, it was designed by Edward Browning. As well as being a rectory, the house is also run as a bed and breakfast.

Incumbents

Martyn Taylor, the current rector, served as curate at the church between 1996 and 2003 before becoming rector.

Source: Commemorative plaque on the church wall

References

External links 

St George's Church Website

Church of England church buildings in Lincolnshire
15th-century church buildings in England
Churches in Stamford, Lincolnshire
Grade I listed churches in Lincolnshire